Perspectiva (Perspective) is the sixth studio album recorded by Puerto Rican salsa singer Gilberto Santa Rosa released in October 18, 1991. It was nominated for Tropical/Salsa Album of the Year at the Lo Nuestro Awards of 1993.

Track listing
This information adapted from Allmusic.

Chart performance

Certification

See also
List of Billboard Tropical Albums number ones from the 1990s

References

1991 albums
Gilberto Santa Rosa albums
Sony Discos albums